Krzywiń  is a town in west-central Poland in the Kościan County, Greater Poland Voivodeship, located at the Obra canal.

History

Krzywiń was first referred to in scripts as Crivin in 1181. But it was not until 1237 that the area's reputation grew as a prominent marketplace. It was then that it was referred to as a town. Incorporation of the town followed in 1257. It was a private church town, administratively located in the Kościan County in the Poznań Voivodeship in the Greater Poland Province of the Kingdom of Poland.

During the German occupation of Poland (World War II), local prominent Poles were among the victims of a massacre of Poles from the county, perpetrated by the Germans in November 1939 in the forest near Kościan as part of the Intelligenzaktion. In 1943, the German security police carried out expulsions of Poles, who were then placed in a transit camp in Poznań, and afterwards deported to the General Government in the more eastern part of German-occupied Poland, while their houses and farms were handed over to German colonists as part of the Lebensraum policy.

Education
There are three schools in Krzywiń. There is a primary school, a junior high school and a high school.

Sports
The local football club is Promień Krzywiń. It competes in the lower leagues.

Notable people
 

Krystyn Szelejewski (d. 1457/1459), Polish nobleman and castellan

References

External links
http://www.krzywin.pl/

Cities and towns in Greater Poland Voivodeship
Kościan County